The Burnt River is a  tributary of the Snake River in eastern Oregon, United States. Draining  , it flows predominantly west to east.

The river begins at Unity Reservoir at the confluence of the North, West, Middle, and South forks of the river. The reservoir is slightly east of the Wallowa-Whitman National Forest in the Blue Mountains and slightly north of Unity. Unity Lake State Recreation Site adjoins the reservoir. As it leaves the lake, the river flows under Oregon Route 245, then runs east through the upper Burnt River Valley past Hereford and Bridgeport and, through the Burnt River Canyon, to Durkee. Turning generally south at Durkee, the river runs along Interstate 84 past Weatherby, Dixie, and Lime before flowing under the Interstate and turning east again. Shortly thereafter, it passes Huntington and reaches the Snake.

See also
 List of rivers of Oregon
 List of longest streams of Oregon

References

Rivers of Oregon
Rivers of Baker County, Oregon
Tributaries of the Snake River